"You're a Lie" is a song by Slash featuring Myles Kennedy and The Conspirators. It is the lead single from Slash's 2012 album, Apocalyptic Love. The song peaked at #1 on the Canadian Active Rock chart for five weeks straight.

Reception
The song has received mixed reviews from critics. Will Hermes of Rolling Stone gave the song a rating of 2 1/2 out of 5 stars. Amy Sciarretto of Loudwire gave the song a 4 out of 5 rating, describing the song as "a rowdy, bluesy rocker, anchored by Slash’s signature riffing and style." The song was listed on Loudwire's 66 Best Hard Rock Songs of the 21st Century.

Charts

Weekly charts

Year-end charts

Personnel
Slash – lead guitar
Myles Kennedy – lead vocals, rhythm guitar
Todd Kerns – bass, screams
Brent Fitz – drums

References

External links

Songs written by Slash (musician)
Songs written by Myles Kennedy
2012 singles
Slash (musician) songs
2012 songs
Song recordings produced by Eric Valentine